Hana Koudelová is a Czechoslovak retired slalom canoeist who competed in the late 1960s and the early 1970s. She won three medals at the ICF Canoe Slalom World Championships with two golds (Mixed C-2: 1971; Mixed C-2 team: 1969) and a bronze (Mixed C-2: 1969).

References

Czechoslovak female canoeists
Possibly living people
Year of birth missing (living people)
Medalists at the ICF Canoe Slalom World Championships